Vaquera is an American ready-to-wear fashion brand.

The brand is known for their dadaist and D.I.Y. sensibilities, "fashion fan fiction" pieces, like the Tiffany and Co. bag dress, and oversized garments. Since its inceptions, runway shows feature models in an angsty run down the runway. Vaquera was nominated for the 2017 Edition of the CFDA/Vogue Fashion Fund.

History 
The label was founded in 2013 by Alabama-born Patric DiCaprio, with co-designers Bryn Taubensee, Claire Sully and David Moses working alongside the brand throughout the 2010s. Bryn Taubensee has stayed as the brand's co-creative director. Emma Wyman is the brand's stylist and Walter Pearce is the brand's casting director.

Collaborators 
Vaquera periodically collaborates with various arts and culture entities. In June 2017, the brand collaborated with Hulu's The Handmaid's Tale to create a runway collection. In 2020, Dover Street Market New York hosted the designers’ February runway show and subsequently joined Dover's Paris-based showroom-cum-incubator which also includes Eli Russell Linnetz, Rassvet, and Honey Fucking Dijon.

American fashion
American fashion designers